Augusta Victoria, later Auguste Victoria, placed in service in 1889 and named for Empress Augusta Victoria, wife of German Emperor Wilhelm II, was the name ship of the Augusta Victoria series and the first of a new generation of luxury Hamburg America Line ocean liners. She was the first liner built in continental Europe with twin propellers and when first placed in service, the fastest liner in the Atlantic trade. In 1897, the ship was rebuilt and lengthened and in 1904 she was sold to the Imperial Russian Navy, which renamed her Kuban.

Engineering
The ship had eight double ended main coal fired boilers and an auxiliary boiler. The main boilers provided steam for the two inverted three cylinder triple expansion engines each driving a steel four bladed  diameter propeller with  pitch. Maximum power was about 25,000 ihp. Coal bunker capacity was 2,260 tons and consumption about 220 tons per day.

History

Hamburg America Line
Albert Ballin commissioned Augusta Victoria and her sister ship Columbia in 1887, soon after joining the Hamburg America Line as head of passenger service. Augusta Victoria, the first to be put in service, was originally to have been called Normannia but was renamed for the Empress after Wilhelm II became Emperor. Augusta Victoria was the first continental European liner with twin screws, which made her both faster and more reliable. (The two previous twin-screw liners were the British-built City of New York and City of Paris of the Inman Line.) In May 1889, her maiden voyage to New York broke a record, taking only seven days. In November 1889, Nellie Bly sailed to Southampton on the Augusta Victoria on the first leg of her 72-day race around the world.

She was also the first luxury liner at Hamburg America, introducing the concept of the "floating hotel"; she had "a rococo stairhall, illuminated by a milky way of pear-shaped prisms and naked light bulbs clutched by gilded cherubs, a reception court choked by palm trees and a dark and gothic smoking room." Ballin had her interior design work done by Johann Poppe, the designer at Hamburg America's rival line, North German Lloyd, whose ships already had a reputation for elegance. She was immediately successful, but she and her sister ship were an economic drain on the line because they required more coal than slower ships and could not carry much freight or many steerage passengers and were therefore profitable only in the summer season, and it was risky to operate them at all from Hamburg in very bad weather, when the Elbe was packed with ice.

Off-season pleasure cruises were therefore started in 1891, and Augusta Victorias cruise in the Mediterranean and the Near East from 22 January to 22 March 1891, with 241 passengers including the Ballins themselves, is often stated to have been the first ever cruise. Christian Wilhelm Allers published an illustrated account of it as Backschisch (Baksheesh). Some people claim the British Orient Line was the first to offer cruises since the late 1880s. However, those ships were principally  for the transportation of passenger, goods and mail between two or more ports, such as between England and Australia, with leisure travel being an adjunct.

In 1897, the ship underwent a comprehensive rebuilding at Harland & Wolff in Belfast arriving in the graving dock 19 December 1896. The new section was to be inserted between the second and third boiler compartments with an additional boiler inserted to total nine. Part of the original forward boiler compartment would be converted to staterooms. Her name was also changed to Auguste Victoria to correct an original inaccuracy; the Empress spelt her name with an e.

Imperial Russian Navy
While Augusta Victoria was under construction, the Emperor persuaded both Hamburg America and its rival Norddeutscher Lloyd to make their future liners convertible to auxiliary cruisers in time of war. Like all German fast liners built from then until 1914, she therefore had reinforced decks which could support gun platforms. In 1904 she and the other three ships in the series were sold to the Russian Navy; she was renamed Kuban and became a cruiser, but was assigned to be a scout ship. She sailed in the Far East with Admiral Zinovy Rozhestvensky's fleet in the Russo-Japanese War, but did not see action. She was broken up at Stettin in 1907.

Notes

References

Sources
 (Reissued as

External links

S/S Augusta Victoria, Hamburg America Line at Norway-Heritage
Elevation and upper deck plans, lower deck plans and sections, at Wunderwaffe.narod.ru
Auguste Victoria after 1897 rebuilding, at Wunderwaffe.narod.ru
Passenger list for first cruise, 22 January – 22 March 1891 at cwallers.de 

Ocean liners
Ships of the Hamburg America Line
1888 ships
Ships built in Stettin